VX, originally  Rock-It-Ball, is a ball sport from the UK. It evolved in North Yorkshire (Great Britain) and was launched in February 2006 at the Youth Sport Trust's Sports Colleges Conference.  The sport was continually developed by the International Federation and in 2012 the Federation approved a move by the worldwide membership to rename the sport VX to cater for its international development.

VX has continued to be popular in schools in the UK  and is now being adopted by universities, colleges, youth organisations, Street Games and the military.  It is also attracting interest from the Prison Service and Primary Care Trusts.  It now has a foothold in 25 countries of which 15 have National Governing Bodies(NGBs).

VX is a gender-neutral sport. Males and females play on a totally equal footing in all disciplines and at all levels. It is also accessible to players of all abilities. It is not an adaptation of any single sport however there are elements of several sports including dodgeball, lacrosse, basque pelota and hockey.

History
The sport, originally known as Rock-It-Ball, is a ball sport which originated from the British Isles. It evolved in North Yorkshire (Great Britain) and was officially launched at the Youth Sport Trust's Sports Colleges Conference in February 2006.

Rock-It-Ball spread through schools in the UK. It featured on four of the Youth Sport Trust's programmes, began to be played regularly in 17 countries, and saw the establishment of an international federation and eleven national governing bodies

Over time the international administrative body had taken the original game and further developed and extended it, setting up a full sports infrastructure. In 2012, in order to cater for the international growth, the sport was rebranded by the international community to VX.  All the clubs and NGBs followed suit and now all leagues, tournaments and international competitions are under the VX banner.

In August 2017 VX gained international recognition as a sport at the General Assembly of the Sport Recognised Association.

Rules
VX is played by two teams of five players.  The court is roughly the size of a sports hall with four badminton courts.  In the US, basketball courts are used.  Each player uses a VstiX.  This is made up of a control bar and a thrower/catcher at each end.  Players are not restricted to a certain area but can go anywhere on court.  They must dribble by rock-ing the ball between the two ends, or by using one end of the VstiX to bounce the ball on the floor. Five balls are in play.  One point is scored by hitting an opponent with the ball between the shoulders and the feet. Three points are scored by catching an opponent's thrown ball.  When a player is hit (s)he must stand still, raise a hand and look to the referee.  The referee records the point and tells the player to play on. The referee is assisted by two umpires positioned on the opposite side of the court.  The role of the umpires is simply to look for infringements.  All infringements incur a three-point penalty.  Violence results in ejection from the game and disciplinary action.  Examples of infringements are:

 A player fails to acknowledge a strike.
 Fishing (this refers to picking up a ball while waiting to play on after being hit)
 Travelling, i.e. not dribbling.  A player can take two steps and then must dribble.  
 Striking.  A player is not allowed to strike either the ball or another player with the VstiX.
 Illegal bodily contact - for example deliberately barging into an opponent.
 Knocking the ball out of an opponent's VstiX.
 Swearing

Formal matches consists of four quarters each of which lasts four minutes.

Versions
As part of the development of VX, the International Federation introduced Singles (V2), a 1v1v1 (V3) version and Doubles (V4) 	
 V2 is played by two players on a squash court with three balls. This version is possibly the most intense of the official versions. A game lasts for two halves of four minutes each.
 V3 is also a singles version played on a squash court, however it is played by three players using four balls.  V3 is played on the basis of ‘every man for himself.’ The winner is the player who concedes the fewest  points. A game lasts for two halves of four minutes each.
 V4 is also played on a squash court and is played 2v2 with four balls. A game lasts for two halves of four minutes each.	 
	
The new versions were created by the International Federation to develop the sport and provide individuals with an opportunity to set up clubs more easily.

Current v2 National Rankings, England (senior)
Joe Willis
 Scott Snowdon
 Carl Alsop
 Tom Hildreth
 Matty Horsfield
 Tom Burgess
 Lena Fowles
 Jess Porter
 Chris Town
 Iona Freeborn

Current v2 National Rankings, England (youth)
 Oliver Stocks
 Jak Foster
 Andrew Davidson
 Henry Pittham
 Jhapin Shahi
 Becca Fram
 Cain Branton
 Patrick Cavanagh
 Trinity Benson
 Will Seabourne
 Emma Fram
 Ellie Bowman

Current v2 National Rankings, England (junior)
 Jonathon Ward
 Toby Helferrich
 Matthew Ayre
 Charlie Fram
 Ed Pharaoh
 Antonia Evans
 Ellie Torrens-Burton
 Edward Dobbs
 Tom Griffiths
 Sam Griffiths
 Jamie Pritchard

Current v2 National Rankings, England (masters)
 Andrew Foster
 Leigh Branton
 Karen Bruin
 Jill Stocks
 Karen Evans
 Ricky Gibson

Current v2 European Rankings (senior)
 Carl Alsop (England)
 Joe Willis (England) 
 Tom Hildreth (England)
 Dan Raper (England)
 James Foster (England)
 Jess Porter (England)
 Dan Shuker (England)
 Egoitz Campo Gonzalez (Basque Country)
 Scott Snowdon (England)

Current v2 European Rankings (youth)
 Oliver Stocks (England)
 Becca Fram (England) 
 Andrew Davidson (England)
 Cain Branton (England)
 Patrick Cavanagh (England)

Current v2 European Rankings (masters)
 Leigh Branton (England)
 Karen Bruin (England) 
 Jill Stocks (England)
 Widen (Basque Country)

Current v2 World Rankings (senior)
 Scott Snowdon (England) 
 Tom Hildreth  (England) 
 Carl Alsop (England)
 Matty Horsfield (England)
 Charlie Ford (England)
 Joe Willis (England)
 Dan Raper (England)
 Dan Shuker (England)
 Tom Burgess(England)
 Jess Porter (England)
 Chris Town (England)
 Iona Freeborn (Scotland)
 Léna Fowles (England)
 Frances Tse (Hong Kong)
 Lai Ka Wan (Hong Kong)
 Laddi Bhardwaj (India)
 Lai Ka Wan (Hong Kong)
 Harish Kumar (India)
 Sharng (India)
 Laddi Bhardwaj (India)
 Osman Wong (Hong Kong)
 Natalie Chan (Hong Kong)
 Ching Nam Choy (Hong Kong)
 Kagf Lam (Hong Kong)
 Rahul (India)

v2 World Rankings (Youth)
 Becca Fram (England) 
 Andrew Davidson (England) 
 Oliver Stocks (England) 
 Jak Foster (England)
 Cain Branton (England)
 Jhapin Shahi (England) and winner of the Cornerstones AWard
 Parminder Singh (India)
 Ellie Bowman (England)
 Henry Pittham (England)
 Patrick Cavanagh (England)
 Matthew So (Hong Kong)
 Emma Fram (England)
 Trinity Benson (England)
 Tsz Yan Lai (Hong Kong)
 Shyamkin (India)
 Samant (India)
 Leah Drake (England)
 Yoyo Chan (Hong Kong)
 Sonia Lau (Hong Kong)
 Karamjot Singh (India)

v2 World Rankings (Masters)
 Leigh Branton (England)
 Karen Bruin (England)
 Andrew Foster (England)
 Jill Stocks (England)
 Sewa Singh (India)
 Karen Evans (England)
 Suman Shankar Tiwari (India)
 Ricky Gibson (England)
 Gurmukh Singh (India)

Federation
The International Federation was established in December 2006 but changed its name to Global VX when the sport was rebranded in 2012. Global VX administers the sport on a global basis, assists with the establishment and running of NGBs  and organises international competition.  Global VX also runs the annual rules committee which takes place every January.

Global VX also has an awards programme.  The annual 'Executive' Awards recognise the work of volunteers in the sport.  'The Person of the Year' Award is awarded to an outstanding volunteer who has done exceptional work to promote and develop the sport.  The 'Person of the Year' and the Executive Awards are announced annually on Dec 31st

2010: Person of the Year: Conrad Broughton (England) 
2011: Person of the Year: Matti Chasan Bergstein (Denmark) 
2012: The first Person of the Year since the sport was rebranded: VX Uganda.  Unusually, the award did not go to one individual but was presented to VX Uganda as a body to recognise the work and effort that had been made by several people to grow the sport in Africa 
2013: Person of the Year: Eric Clark (Ripon Lions) & John Sheepy (Boroughbridge Lions) 
2014: Person of the Year: Tony Notarianni (USA)
2015: Person of the Year: Dr Suman Shankar Tiwari (India) 
2016: Person of the Year: Matty Horsfield (England) 
2017: Person of the Year: Alessandro Foglino (Italy) 
2018: Person of the Year: Dr Suman Shankar Tiwari (India) 
2019: Person of the Year: Osman Wong (Hong Kong) 
2020: Person of the Year: No awards made due to Covid 
2018: Person of the Year: Carl Alsop (England)

Hall of Fame
Any member affiliated to Global VX (e.g. player, coach, administrator) can nominate any other affiliated member who they consider to have made an outstanding contribution to the sport. Any nominee with three nominations passes to the next stage for voting by the committee. The Hall of Fame Awards generally takes place every two years. In 2010 the voting committee felt unable to differentiate between the 3 nominees who reached the voting stage and so, as an exception, voted to induct all three.
In 2008 the founders of the original sport (Paul Hildreth, Paul Law, Bob Eldridge) were honoured by inducting them into the newly established Hall of Fame. 
2008: Tom Hildreth, Craig Buttery, Paul Hildreth
2010: Carl Alsop, Graeme Wood, Ian Crosby
2015: Helen Mackenzie

Legends
The 'Legends' Award and Gallery is reserved for players who have reached an outstanding level of achievement. This award was instigated in 2012 as a direct result of the achievements of Scotland's Scott MacMichael and is not intended to be an annual honour.
2012: Scott MacMichael (Scotland)
2013: Tom Hildreth (England)
2018: Scott Snowdon (England)
2022: Carl Alsop (England)

External awards
As the sport has grown its impact has started to be recognised by external bodies:
2009: Global VX (in its previous incarnation) was the only organisation to be nominated in three categories at the Cleveland Fire Service Safer Community Awards
2011: Dan Raper shortlisted in the Ripon Rotary Youth Volunteer Awards
2011: Paul Hildreth runner-up in the Sports Category of the Minster FM Local Hero Awards
2012: Tom Hildreth and Helen Mackenzie Olympic Torchbearers 
2012: Tom Hildreth shortlisted for the Ackrill Media Volunteer Oscars
2013: Easi-RockIts HellCats win Minster FM Team of the Year in the Minster FM Local Hero Awards 
2013: Tom Hildreth shortlisted for the Ackrill Media Volunteer Oscars
2013: Tom Hildreth runner-up as Player of the Year in the Hambleton District Council Sports Awards 
2013: Paul Hildreth runner-up as Coach of the Year in the Hambleton District Council Sports Awards 
2013: Easi-RockIts runners-up as Club of the Year in the Hambleton District Council Sports Awards 
2014: Jack Brown runner-up as Student Sportsperson of the Year in the Active York Awards
2014: Carl Alsop finalist as Sportsperson of the Year in the York Community Pride Awards
2014: Tom Hildreth finalist as Sportsperson of the Year in the Hambleton District Council Sports Awards
2014: Paul Hildreth finalist as Coach of the Year in the Hambleton District Council Sports Awards
2014: Karen Bruin finalist as Coach of the Year in the Hambleton District Council Sports Awards
2014: Hannah Smith runner-up as Junior Sportswoman of the Year in the Hambleton District Council Sports Awards
2014: Tom Hildreth 'Highly Commended' Award at the Harrogate Volunteering Oscars, Unsung Hero category
2014: Tom Hildreth 'Highly Commended' Award at the Harrogate Volunteering Oscars, Sports Volunteer category
2015: Jack Brown shortlisted as Sportsman of the Year in the Active York Sports Awards
2015: Charlie Ford shortlisted as Student Sportsperson of the Year in the Active York Sports Awards
2015: Jack Brown runner-up as Sportsman of the Year in the York University Student Union Sports Awards
2016: Scott Snowdon shortlisted as Sportsman of the Year in the Active York Sports Awards
2016: Tom Hildreth 'Highly Commended' Award at the Harrogate Volunteering Oscars, Sports Volunteer category
2016: Matty Horsfield finalist as Coach of the Year in the Hambleton District Council Sports Awards
2017: Matty Carr, runner-up in the Sports Officials UK Awards
2017: Hambleton District Council Sports Awards.  5 Finalists - Tom Hildreth as Sportsperson of the Year; Matty Horsfield as Coach of the Year; Karen Bruin as Volunteer of the Year; Matthew Leyshon and Becca Fram as Young Sportsperson of the Year
2018: Hoops Heroes.  Paul Hildreth named as the third 'Hoops Hero' by Hoops Connect.
2019: Orfi Heroes.  Paul Hildreth named as the first 'Orfi Hero' by Orfi Active.

Ambassadors and patrons
The role of Official VX Ambassador was originally taken by Olympic Diver Jack Laugher. 
The latest Global VX Ambassador is Natalie Chan from Hong Kong. 
VX's first patron is trail blade runner Phil Sheridan.  The latest patron is Sylvia Grice MBE, a member of Ripon Lions. 
The patron of VX Kenya is Mr Cosmas Nabungolo 
The patron of VX Uganda is Mr Isaac Ssekamwa

UK clubs
York VX Club:  Teams - Phoenix, Raiders
Easi-Rock-Its VX Club: Teams -  Hellcats, HellFighters, HellDivers
Scunthorpe VX Club - Jaguars
Northallerton VX Club: Team - Vipers
Ripon VX Club: Teams - Vanquish, VorteX
Kirkbymoorside Bullz
Stillington VX Club 
Worcester & West Midlands

Denmark Clubs
VX Naestved

Uganda Clubs
Canaanites, Lugazi

Centres of Excellence and academies
Centres of Excellence and coaching academies are being established. 
English National Centre of : Ripon Grammar School, Ripon, North Yorks 
 Ugandan National Centre of Excellence is to be the Lugazi Community High School
 Kenyan National Centre of Excellence is to be the St. Peter's Boys' School, Mumias

Statistics
2005 Inaugural Championships: Team Chaos, Northallerton College
2007 World Cup: Scotland.  Runners-up: England.  Third: Pakistan
2007 Carnegie British Open: Loughborough University
2008 English National League, National Champions: Easi-RockIts HellCats
2008 Tees Valley Pairs Tournament: Callum Watt/Chris Durrant
2008 Youth World Cup: England
2009 v3 English Open: Emily Wilson (Tees Valley)
2009 Central and East Yorks ATC championship: 2487 (Easingwold) Typhoons
2009 English National League, National Champions: Easi-RockIts HellCats
2009 National Junior Pairs: Ben Pulleyn/Callum Forsyth (York)
2009 v3 European Open: Adam Rawcliffe (Easi-RockIts)
2010 v3 English Open: Carl Alsop (Raptors)
2010 English National League, National Champions: Raptors.
2010 English National League, National Finals Player of the Tournament: Marcus Exelby (HellCats).
2010 v2 World Champion: Carl Alsop.
2011 v2 Youth World Champion: Dan Raper.
2011 Scottish National League, National Champions: Falkirk Cannons.
2011 English National, National Champions: Raptors.  Runners-up: Easi-RockIts HellCats
2011 English National League, National Finals Player of the Tournament: Callum Watt (HellCats).
2011 v2 World Champion: Scott MacMichael (Scotland).
2011 World Cup: Scotland.  Runners-up: England, 3rd: Denmark. Fair Play Award: Denmark
2011 World Cup, Player of the Tournament: Matti Chasan Bergstein (Denmark).
2011 UK Club Champions: Falkirk Cannons.
2012 The Sport Becomes VX	
2012 English Open Knockout: Easi-RockIts HellCats	
2012 English National VX League, National Champions: Easi-RockIts HellCats. Runners-up: Ripon	
2012 v2 World Champion: Tom Hildreth (England). Runner-up: Scott MacMichael (Scotland)	
2012 v2 Youth World Champion: Meghan Plummer(Scotland). Runner-up: Aaron Perry (England).	
2012 v2 African Nations Champion: Melingha Timothy (Uganda). Runner up: Didus Businge (Uganda)
2012 UK Club Champions: HellCats. Runners-Up: Ripon; 3rd Place: Scunthorpe
2013 English Open Knockout: York Phoenix
2013 English National VX League, National Champions: Scunthorpe Hawks
2013 V2 World Champion: Tom Hildreth (England). Runner-up: Scott Snowdon (England)
2013 V2 Youth World Champion: Tom Brown (England); Runner-up: Liam Leckenby (England)
2013 V2 African Nations Champion: Melingha Timothy (Uganda); Runner-up: Derek Wesana.  
2013 UK Club Champions: York Phoenix; Runners-up: Scunthorpe Hawks
2014 English University V2 Champion: Jack Brown (University of York); Runner-Up: Ellery Lovett (University of Sheffield)
2014 English Open Knockout: York Phoenix
2014 English National VX League, National Champions: York Phoenix
2014 V2 World Champion: Jack Brown (England). Runner-Up: Carl Alsop (England)
2014 V2 Youth World Champion: Tom Brown (England). Runner-Up: Charlie Ford (England)
2014 V2 Masters World Champion: Paul Hildreth (England); Runner-up: Conrad Broughton (England)
2014 UK Club Champions: York Phoenix; Runners-up: Ripon Vanquish
2015 V2 National Champion (England): Jack Brown
2015 V2 Youth National Champion (England): Tom Brown
2015 V2 Junior National Champion (England): Hannah Smith
2015 English Open Knockout: York
2015 National Champions: Scunthorpe Hawks
2015 VX World Champions: England; Runners-up: India
2015 V2 World Champion: Scott Snowdon (England); Runner-up: Carl Alsop (England)
2015 V2 Youth World Champion: Tom Brown (England); Runner-up: Will Charters-Reid (England)
2015 V2 Masters World Champion: Paul Hildreth (England); Runner-up: Conrad Broughton (England)
2015 V2 Executive Cup Champion: Sahil Tiwari (India); Runner-up: Vijay Gupta (India)
2015 UK Club Champions: HellCats; Runners-Up: Scunthorpe Hawks
2016 Inaugural 365 Invitational Challenge Cup: winner Scott Snowdon; Runner-up Tom Hildreth.  Cornerstones Award: Matty Horsfield
2016 V2 National Champion (England): Scott Snowdon
2016 V2 Youth National Champion (England): Matthew Leyshon
2016 V2 Junior National Champion (England): Oliver Stocks
2016 V2 Masters National Champion (England): Paul Hildreth
2016 English University V2 Champion: James Foster (University of Nottingham); Runner-Up: Aaron Perry (University of Nottingham)
2016 English Open Knockout: York
2016 First Test Match Series held: India and England.  Winners England
2016 National Champions: York Phoenix. Player of the Tournament: Leah Drake (Ripon); Cornerstones Award: Tom Hildreth (Ripon)
2016 V2 World Champion: Scott Snowdon (England); Runner-up: Tom Hildreth (England)
2016 V2 Youth World Champion: Kane Duncan (England); Runner-up: Jess Porter (England) (Jess also winner of the Cornerstones Award)
2016 V2 Masters World Champion: Paul Hildreth (England); Runner-up: Andrew Foster (England)
2016 V2 Craig Buttery Trophy: Tom Burgess (England); Runner-up: Dan Shuker (England)
2016 V2 Craig Buttery Trophy, Youth: Ethan Eldridge (England); Runner-up: Jhapin Shahi (England)
2016 V2 Craig Buttery Trophy, Masters: Sewa Singh (India); Runner-up: Gurmukh Singh (India)
2016 European Champions: England.  Runners-Up: Italy.  Player of the Tournament: Diego Venturini (Italy); Cornerstones Award: Martel Martinez (Basque Country)
2016 V2 European Champion: Tom Hildreth (England).  Runner-up: Scott Snowdon: England
2016 UK Club Champions: York Phoenix; Runners-Up: Ripon Vanquish. Player of the Tournament: Charlie Ford (Phoenix); Cornerstones Award: Paul Hildreth (HellFighters)
2017 V2 National Champion (England): Scott Snowdon.  Runner-up Tom Hildreth.  Cornerstones Award: Carl Alsop
2017 V2 Youth National Champion (England): Matthew Leyshon. Runner-up Jess Porter
2017 V2 Junior National Champion (England): Henry Pittham.  Runner-up Oliver Stocks  Cornerstones Award: Ewan Gilmore
2017 V2 Masters National Champion (England): Paul Hildreth. Runner-up Leigh Branton
2017 365 Invitational Challenge Cup: Winner Scott Snowdon. Runner-up Tom Hildreth.  Cornerstones Award: Tom Hildreth
2017 English Open Knockout: York
2017 National Champions: York Phoenix. Player of the Tournament: Matty Horsfield (Northallerton); Cornerstones Award: Dave Snowdon (Northallerton)
2017 V2 World Champion: Scott Snowdon (England); Runner-up: Tom Hildreth (England)
2017 V2 Youth World Champion: Matthew Leyshon (England); Runner-up: Jess Porter (England) (Jess also winner of the Cornerstones Award)
2017 V2 Masters World Champion: Paul Hildreth (England); Runner-up: Leigh Branton(England)
2017 V2 Craig Buttery Trophy: Neil Young (England); Runner-up: Marco Marinetti (Italy)
2017 V2 Craig Buttery Trophy, Youth: Chris Town (England); Runner-up: Cain Branton (England)
2017 V2 Craig Buttery Trophy, Masters: Jill Stocks (England); Runner-up: Stefan Fischer (Switzerland)
2017 UK Club Champions: Ripon Vanquish
2017 Tri-Services V2 Championship: Lt Dan Raper RN; Runner-up SAC Philippa Fowles RAF; 3rd Cpl Darragh J T, AGC (RMP) Army
2018 V2 National Champion (England): Scott Snowdon.  Runner-up Charlie Ford.  Cornerstones Award: Chris Town
2018 V2 Youth National Champion (England): Joe Willis. Runner-up Andrew Davidson
2018 V2 Junior National Champion (England): Henry Pittham.  Runner-up Matthew Ayre  Cornerstones Award: Jamie Pritchard
2018 V2 Masters National Champion (England): Paul Hildreth. Runner-up Karen Bruin
2018 365 Invitational Challenge Cup: Winner Tom Hildreth. Runner-up Carl Alsop .  Cornerstones Award: Chris Town
2018 English Open Knockout: York Phoenix
2018 English Junior Knockout: Ripon
2018 V2 World Champion: Tom Hildreth (England); Runner-up: Dan Raper (England)
2018 V2 Youth World Champion: Oliver Stocks (England); Runner-up: Parminder Singh (India) 
2018 V2 Masters World Champion: Paul Hildreth (England); Runner-up: Sewa Singh (India)  (Paul Hildreth then announces retirement from competitive V2)
2018 V2 Craig Buttery Trophy: Kunal Sharma (India); Runner-up: Adarsh Bhadoria (UAE)
2018 V2 Craig Buttery Trophy, Youth: Gurjot Kaur (India); Runner-up: Aryan (India)
2018 V2 Craig Buttery Trophy, Masters: Neelam Rani (India); Runner-up: Manjeet Singh (India)
2018 National Champions: York Phoenix. Player of the Tournament: Will Charters-Reid (York); Cornerstones Award: Patrick Cavanagh (Easi-RockIts)
2018 UK Club Champions: York Phoenix.
2019 V2 National Champion (England): Scott Snowdon.  Runner-up Carl Alsop.  Cornerstones Award: Matty Horsfield & Jill Stocks
2019 V2 Youth National Champion (England): Oliver Stocks. Runner-up Jak Foster
2019 V2 Junior National Champion (England): Jonathon Ward.  Runner-up Toby Helfferich  Cornerstones Award: Jamie Pritchard
2019 V2 Masters National Champion (England): Andrew Foster. Runner-up Leigh Branton
2019 National Champions: York Phoenix. 
2019 UK Club Champions: York Phoenix.
2019 365 Invitational Challenge Cup: Winner Scott Snowdon. Runner-up Carl Alsop .  Cornerstones Award: Carl Alsop
2019 VX World Champions: England 
2019 VX Youth World Champions: England 
2019 V2 World Champion: Scott Snowdon.  Runner-up: Tom Hildreth
2019 V2 Youth World Champion: Becca Fram.  Runner-up: Andrew Davidson
2019 V2 Masters World Champion: Leigh Branton.  Runner-up: Karen Bruin
2019 V2 World Championships Cornerstones Award: Jhapin Shahi
2019 V2 Craig Buttery Trophy: Tom Burgess.  Runner-up: Jess Porter
2019 V2 Craig Buttery Trophy, Youth: Henry Pittham.  Runner-up: Patrick Cavanagh
2019 V2 Craig Buttery Trophy, Masters: Sewa Singh.  Runner-up: Karen Evans
2020 & 2021 National Champions: Event cancelled due to Coronavirus Pandemic
2020 & 2021 UK Club Champions: Event cancelled due to Coronavirus Pandemic
2020 & 2021 English Open Knockout: Event cancelled due to Coronavirus Pandemic
2020 & 2021 English Junior Knockout: Event cancelled due to Coronavirus Pandemic
2020 & 2021 V2 World Championships cancelled due to Coronavirus Pandemic
2020 & 2021 European Championships cancelled due to Coronavirus Pandemic

References

External links 
 The International Federation - Global VX 
The VX video site 
 the England VX Association - VX England
the India VX Association
the Scotland VX Association - VX Scotland
the American VX Association - VX USA
the Ugandan VX Association - VX Uganda
the VX Association of the United Arab Emirates - VX UAE
the VX Association for the Basque Country
the VX Association for Italy
Kirkbymoorside Bullz VX Club
EasiRockIts (Easingwold) VX Club
Scunthorpe VX Club
Stillington VX Club
Ripon VX Club
Worcester & West Midlands VX Club
Northallerton VX Club
Naestved VX Club
香港VX球運動總會  Hong Kong VX

Photos

Ball games
Team sports
Games of physical skill